List of later stave churches and replicas

Denmark 
 Halmens Cemetery Chapel, Holmens Cemetery, Copenhagen, built in 1902.
 Hørning Stave Church, Moesgård Museum, Aarhus, reconstruction of an old church.

Sweden 
 Hållandsgårdens stave church in Åre, Jämtland, built 1999
 Häggviks stave church in Nordingrå, Norrland, built 2000
 Kårböle stave church in Ljusdal, Gävleborg, built 1989
 Skaga stave church in Töreboda, Västra Götaland county, built in the 12th century, torn down in the 19th century, rebuilt in the 1950s, burnt down, and rebuilt again in 2001
 Saint Olaf's chapel in Hardemo, Svealand, built 1766–1767
 Lillsjöhögen Stave Church (2011).

Iceland 
 Heimaey stave church at Heimaey, Vestmannaeyjar, built 2000

Poland 
 Vang Stave Church at Karpacz from Vang, Innlandet translated in 1842.

United States 
 Chapel in the Hills in Rapid City, South Dakota
 Boynton Chapel at Bjorklunden, Door County, Wisconsin
 Hopperstad Stave Church (replica) in Moorhead, Minnesota
 Norway Pavilion at Epcot in Walt Disney World, Florida
 Scandinavian Heritage Park in Minot, North Dakota
 St. Mark's Episcopal Church, in Islip, New York
 St. Swithun's in Warren County, Indiana
 Washington Island Stavkirke on Washington Island, Wisconsin.
 Little Norway, Wisconsin near Blue Mounds in Dane County, Wisconsin
Borgound Stave Church (replica) in Lyme, Connecticut

Norway 
 Fantoft stave church, built c. 1150, destroyed by arson in 1992 and rebuilt in 1997.
 Vår Frue Church (Porsgrunn), a Dragestil church built in 1899 that adheres closely to stave church design
 Fåvang Stave Church in Ringebu, Oppland – rebuilt in 1630 (two old churches rebuilt as one).
 Gol New Stave Church (replica), a replica erected in the 1990s at site in the community from which Gol Stave Church was relocated in the 1880s.
 Haltdalen Stave Church (replica), a copy of the old church at Sverresborg museum.
 Our Lady of Good Counsel Church, Porsgrunn, a Catholic Dragestil church built in 1899 that adheres closely to stave church design.
 St. Olaf's Church, Balestrand, an Anglican Church, built in Dragestil, from 1897. A stave church imitation.
 Johannes' church, Rendalen, built 2014-12017 Opplev Rendalen Johanneskirken

Germany 
 Gustav Adolf stave church in Hahnenklee, Harz region

New Zealand 
 Maria Stavkirke in Norsewood, New Zealand, completed in 2009

References

External links 
 Atlas Obscura "Stave Churches Are All Wood, Dragons, and Beauty"

Stave churches
Stave churches
Stave churches
Replicas of stave churches